Robert Conrad (born Conrad Robert Falk; March 1, 1935 – February 8, 2020) was an American film and television actor, singer, and stuntman. He is best known for his role in the 1965–1969 television series The Wild Wild West, playing the sophisticated Secret Service agent James T. West. He portrayed World War II ace Pappy Boyington in the television series Baa Baa Black Sheep (later syndicated as Black Sheep Squadron). In addition to acting, he was a singer and recorded several pop/rock songs in the late 1950s and early 1960s as Bob Conrad. He hosted a weekly two-hour national radio show (The PM Show with Robert Conrad) on CRN Digital Talk Radio beginning in 2008.

Early life 

Conrad was born Conrad Robert Falk in Chicago. His father, Leonard Henry Falk, was 17 years old at the time of Conrad's birth and was of German descent. His mother, Alice Jacqueline Hartman (daughter of Conrad and Hazel Hartman), was 15 years old when she gave birth, and named her son after her father. She became the first publicity director of Mercury Records, where she was known as Jackie Smith. She married twice, including once to Chicago radio personality Eddie Hubbard in 1948. Eddie Hubbard and Jackie Smith reportedly had a child together (born ) before splitting up in 1958.

Conrad attended Chicago schools including South Shore High School, Hyde Park High School, the YMCA Central School, and New Trier High School. He dropped out of school at age 15 to work full-time, including loading trucks for Consolidated Freightways and Eastern Freightways, and driving a milk truck for Chicago's Bowman Dairy.

After working in Chicago for several years and studying theater arts at Northwestern University, Conrad pursued an acting career. One of his first paying roles was a week-long job posing outside a Chicago theater where the film Giant (1956) was screened; Conrad bore a resemblance to the film's lead, actor James Dean, so his mother used her entertainment industry contacts to help him get the part intended as a publicity stunt to boost attendance at the theater. Conrad also studied singing; his vocal coach was Dick Marx, the father of singer Richard Marx.

Career

Early performances
In 1957, Conrad met actor Nick Adams while visiting James Dean's gravesite in Fairmount, Indiana. They became friends and Adams suggested that Conrad move to California to pursue acting.

Adams got a bit part for Conrad in the film Juvenile Jungle (1958). Adams was supposed to appear in it, but withdrew so he could take a part in a different movie. Conrad's brief non-speaking role in Juvenile Jungle enabled him to join the Screen Actors Guild. He had a small role in the film Thundering Jets, also in 1958.

Warner Bros. 

Conrad was soon signed to an acting contract by Warner Bros. He also sang, and released several recordings with Warner Bros. Records on a variety of LPs, EPs, and SPs 33-1/3 and 45 rpm records during the late 1950s and early 1960s. In 1961, he had a minor Billboard hit song in "Bye Bye Baby" which reached No. 113.

At Warner, he appeared in the second season of the James Garner series Maverick (episode: "Yellow River", 1959). He was featured in other shows, either for Warner or Ziv Television, including Highway Patrol, Lawman, Colt .45 (playing Billy the Kid), Sea Hunt, The Man and the Challenge, and Lock Up.

Hawaiian Eye

Warner Brothers had a big success with its detective show 77 Sunset Strip, then made Hawaiian Eye, a follow-up series. Conrad starred as detective Tom Lopaka. He was introduced on Strip, then spun off into a series that ran from 1959 to 1963, both in the U.S. and overseas. During the series' run, Conrad appeared on an episode of the Warner Brothers series The Gallant Men. After Hawaiian Eye was over, Conrad starred in Palm Springs Weekend (1963), Warners' attempt to repeat the success of Where the Boys Are (1960) with its young contract players.

In Mexico, Conrad signed a recording contract with the Orfeon label. He released two albums with a few singles sung in Spanish. In 1964, he guest-starred on an episode of Temple Houston, then performed in the comedic film La Nueva Cenicienta (also known as The New Cinderella). The next year, he was in the episode "Four into Zero" of Kraft Suspense Theatre, and portrayed Pretty Boy Floyd in Young Dillinger alongside his old friend Nick Adams.

The Wild Wild West

 
In 1965, Conrad began his starring role as government agent James West on the weekly series The Wild Wild West, which aired on CBS until its cancellation in 1969. He made $5,000 a week. He did most of his own stunts and fight scenes during the series, and while filming the season four episode "The Night of the Fugitives", he was injured and rushed to the hospital after he dove from the top of a saloon staircase, lost his grip on a chandelier, fell 12 feet, and landed on his head.

In addition to starring in The Wild Wild West, Conrad found time to work on other projects. He went to Mexico in 1967 to appear in Ven a cantar conmigo (Come, sing with me), a musical. He also formed his own company, Robert Conrad Productions, and under its auspices he wrote, starred in, and directed the Western film The Bandits (also 1967).

Paul Ryan and Jake Webster
Conrad appeared in episodes of Mannix and Mission: Impossible. In 1969, he signed a three-picture deal with Bob Hope's Doan Productions. The first two films were slated to be Keene then No Beer in Heaven but only the first movie was ever produced.<ref>Martin, B. (March 22, 1969) "MOVIE CALL SHEET", Los Angeles Times'</ref>

In 1969, he debuted as prosecutor Paul Ryan in the TV movie D.A.: Murder One (1969). He reprised the movie in D.A.: Conspiracy to Kill (1971) and the short-lived 1971 series The D.A.. In 1971, He also played Deputy D.A. Paul Ryan on Adam-12, (Episode: The Radical). He was also in such made-for-television movies as Weekend of Terror (1970) and Five Desperate Women (1971). He tried another TV series as American spy Jake Webster in Assignment Vienna (1972), which lasted only eight episodes. He was a murderous fitness franchise promoter in a fourth season episode of Columbo ("An Exercise in Fatality", 1974). Conrad starred in the feature films Murph the Surf (1975) and Sudden Death (1977). He reprised his role as Paul Ryan in the TV movie Confessions of the D.A. Man.

Baa Baa Black Sheep
Conrad found ratings success again from 1976 to 1978 as legendary tough-guy World War II fighter ace Pappy Boyington in Baa Baa Black Sheep, retitled for its second season and in later syndication as Black Sheep Squadron. He directed three episodes.

The show's success led Conrad to win a People's Choice Award for Favorite Male Actor and a Golden Globe nomination for his performance. He followed it with a lead part in the television miniseries Centennial (1978).

The Duke and A Man Called Sloane
In 1978, Conrad starred in the short-lived TV series The Duke as Duke Ramsey, a boxer turned private eye. Conrad directed some episodes. In the late 1970s, he served as the captain of the NBC team for six editions of Battle of the Network Stars. Around this time reprised the role of West in a pair of made-for-TV films which reunited him with his West co-star, Ross Martin, The Wild Wild West Revisited (1979) and More Wild Wild West (1980).

Conrad was identified in the late 1970s with his television commercials for Eveready batteries, particularly his placing of the battery on his shoulder and prompting the viewer to challenge its long-lasting power: "Come on, I dare ya". The commercial was parodied frequently on American television comedies such as Johnny Carson's The Tonight Show and The Carol Burnett Show.

Conrad made the occasional feature such as The Lady in Red (1979) for Roger Corman's New World Pictures, where he played John Dillinger from a script by John Sayles. Conrad later played a modern-day variation of James West in the short-lived series A Man Called Sloane in 1979. Conrad directed some episodes.

 1980s: Producer 

Conrad spent most of the 1980s starring in television movies. He played a paraplegic coach in Coach of the Year (1980), and the title role in Will: The Autobiography of G. Gordon Liddy (1982). Both were for his own company, A Shane Productions.

In 1984 Conrad and his production company produced the film, Hard Knox. He played the lead role of U.S. Marine Colonel Joseph Knox. The story reveals a senior Marine aviator who has reached his pinnacle as a flyer and now must face the decision of accepting a promotion to brigadier general with a new ‘ground’ focused future in the Marines, or the possibility of retiring from the Corps and moving on in a different direction with his life. He makes the decision to return to the home of his youth – Mount Carroll, Illinois to visit his alma mater, a local military prep academy,  and look up his mentor from more than 30 years ago. It is there, where the story of ‘Hard Knox’ begins to unfold. The film was shot in Mount Carroll at the former Shimer College.

Conrad played a Police Chief in the theatrically released comedy film Moving Violations (1985), and in the following TV movies; The Fifth Missile (1986), Assassin (1986) and Charley Hannah's War (1986).

In 1986, Conrad served as special guest referee for the main event of WrestleMania 2 between Hulk Hogan and King Kong Bundy in a Steel Cage Match for the WWF Championship.

 1990s 

Conrad appeared in the music video for Richard Marx's "Hazard", which was a No. 1 hit in 13 countries including the United States. He had a supporting role in Jingle All the Way (1996) with Arnold Schwarzenegger. Conrad's later credits include an episode of Nash Bridges and the film Dead Above Ground (2002).

Conrad appeared in the movie Samurai Cowboy in 1994. The following year, he created the TV movie Search and Rescue, in which he starred, which in turn led to a short-lived TV series, also created by Conrad.

 2000s–2010s 

In 2005, he ran for President of the Screen Actors Guild. In 2006, Conrad recorded audio introductions for every episode of the first season of The Wild Wild West for its North American DVD release on June 6. The DVD set also included one of Conrad's Eveready battery commercials; in his introduction, Conrad stated he was flattered to be parodied by Carson. He was inducted into the Hollywood Stuntmen's Hall of Fame for his work on The Wild Wild West series.

Beginning in 2008, he hosted a weekly two-hour national radio show (The PM Show with Robert Conrad) on CRN Digital Talk Radio. He appeared in the documentary film Pappy Boyington Field (released in July 2010 on DVD) where he recounted his personal insights about the legendary Marine Corps aviator he portrayed in the television series. His last appearance on the radio show was July 18, 2019, and Mike Garey was his co-host.

Personal life and death
Conrad and his first wife Joan were married for 25 years and had five children. They divorced amicably in 1977. That same year he met his second wife LaVelda Ione Fann. He was 43 when he emceed the Miss National Teenager Pageant, which she won. Their marriage produced three children before their divorce in 2010. His two families were said to "get along famously". Conrad was joined on some television shows by his sons, Shane and Christian, and his daughter, Nancy. Another daughter, Joan, became a television producer.

In a 2008 interview, Conrad described Chicago Outfit associate and burglar Michael Spilotro as his "best friend". Spilotro's murder was featured in the movie Casino. In 1984, Conrad was awarded a star on the Walk of Western Stars in Newhall, California (now a part of Santa Clarita).

Conrad was involved with a volunteer organization in Bear Valley, California, known as Bear Valley Search and Rescue, which later formed the basis for High Mountain Rangers''.

On March 31, 2003, while on Highway 4 in California's Sierra Nevada foothills near his Alpine County home, Conrad drove his Jaguar over the center median and slammed head-on into a Subaru driven by 26-year-old Kevin Burnett. Both men suffered serious injuries. Tried on felony charges, Conrad pleaded no contest, and he was convicted of drunk driving.

He was sentenced to six months of house confinement, alcohol counseling, and five years' probation. A civil suit filed by Kevin Burnett against Conrad was settled the following year for an undisclosed amount. In 2005, Burnett died at age 28 from perforated ulcers; his family attributed them to his difficult recovery from the crash. Conrad suffered severe nerve injuries from the crash, leaving his right side partially paralyzed.

Conrad died of heart failure in Malibu, California, on February 8, 2020, at age 84.

Filmography

Film

Television

References

External links

 
 
 Robert Conrad (Aveleyman)

1935 births
2020 deaths
20th-century American male actors
21st-century American male actors
Age controversies
American male film actors
American male television actors
American people of German descent
American stunt performers
Male actors from California
Male actors from Chicago
Male Western (genre) film actors
People from Malibu, California
Warner Bros. contract players
Western (genre) television actors